USC women's basketball may refer to:

 South Carolina Gamecocks women's basketball, the collegiate women's basketball program of the University of South Carolina (often referred to as "SC" or "USC" in athletics)
 USC Trojans women's basketball, the collegiate women's basketball program of the University of Southern California